Bob Stevens  (born November 25, 1954) is a sportscaster, best known as a former anchor on the ESPN family of networks. He was at ESPN from 1995 to 2002. 

Stevens graduated from Tulsa University in 1977 with a degree in communications. From 1987-90, Stevens was the sports director at KOTV in Tulsa, Oklahoma. From 1990-94, Stevens was the weekend sports anchor for WEWS in Cleveland, Ohio. While he was there, Stevens created a popular show called Sports Sunday, which wrapped up the week in local sports ranging from professional, amateur, and high school. From 1994-96, Stevens worked as the sports director at WEWS, which he continued doing a month into his ESPN duties.

In 1995, Stevens conducted interviews with Jim Thome, Paul Sorrento, Tony Peña, and Julián Tavárez following the Cleveland Indians' series clinching victory in Game 3 of the American League Division Series against the Boston Red Sox for The Baseball Network/ABC.

In 2006, he started announcing Savannah State football games. He has also called football games for the Army Black Knights and also works for the PGA Tour Network.

External links
 
 
 Bob Stevens - SportsCenter Tribute

Living people
Golf writers and broadcasters
American radio sports announcers
College football announcers
Major League Baseball broadcasters
1954 births
American television sports anchors
American television sports announcers
University of Tulsa alumni
Television personalities from Tulsa, Oklahoma
Television anchors from Cleveland